Pirque is a commune of Chile in Cordillera Province, Santiago Metropolitan Region; it is located 2.8 kilometers southeast of Puente Alto and 21.3 kilometers south-southeast of the center of Santiago. It is situated at the base of the Cajón del Maipo, and is the home of the Concha y Toro wine company.

Demographics

Of these, 9,651 (58.3%) lived in urban areas and 6,914 (41.7%) in rural areas. The population grew by 45.7% (5,197 persons) between the 1992 and 2002 censuses.

Stats
Population: 20,518 (2006 projection)
Average annual household income: US$21,537 (PPP, 2006)
Population below poverty line: 9.1% (2006)

Administration
As a commune, Pirque is a third-level administrative division of Chile administered by a municipal council, headed by an alcalde who is directly elected every four years. The 2012-2016 alcalde is Cristian Balmaceda Undurraga (RN). The communal council has the following members:
 Carlos Miranda Dinamarca (IND)
 Hilda Espinoza Cavieres (IND)
 Patricio Domínguez Warrington (PS)
 Lorena Berrios Gonzalez (RN)
 Pablo Ulloa Riquelme (IND)
 María Mujica Vizcaya (IND)

Within the electoral divisions of Chile, Pirque is represented in the Chamber of Deputies by Mr. Osvaldo Andrade (PS) and Mr. Leopoldo Pérez (RN) as part of the 29th electoral district, (together with Puente Alto, San José de Maipo and La Pintana). The commune is represented in the Senate by Soledad Alvear Valenzuela (PDC) and Ena Von Baer (UDI) as part of the 8th senatorial constituency (Santiago-East).

References

External links
Portal Pirque: Community website Pirque

Communes of Chile
Populated places established in 1887
Populated places in Cordillera Province